The KEAS Tabernacle Christian Methodist Episcopal Church is a historic Christian Methodist Episcopal church at 101 S. Queen Street in Mount Sterling, Kentucky.  It was built in 1893 and added to the National Register in 1983.

It is a late vernacular example of Romanesque Revival architecture.

References

Christian Methodist Episcopal churches in Kentucky
Churches on the National Register of Historic Places in Kentucky
Churches completed in 1893
Churches in Montgomery County, Kentucky
African-American history of Kentucky
National Register of Historic Places in Montgomery County, Kentucky
1893 establishments in Kentucky
Mount Sterling, Kentucky